Flaveria chlorifolia, the clasping yellowtops, is a North American plant species of Flaveria within the family Asteraceae. It is native to the southwestern United States (New Mexico, western Texas) and northern Mexico (Chihuahua, Coahuila, Nuevo León).

Flaveria chlorifolia  is a perennial herb up to 200 cm (80 inches or 6 2/3 feet) tall. One plant can sometimes produce 150 or more flower heads in a branching array, each head with 9-14 yellow disc flowers but no ray flowers.

Chemical composition 
Quercetin-3-sulfate 3'-sulfotransferase is an enzyme that uses 3'-phosphoadenylyl sulfate and quercetin 3-sulfate to produce adenosine 3',5'-bisphosphate and quercetin 3,3'-bissulfate. The enzyme can be found in F. chlorifolia.

Ombuin 3-sulfate, the sulfate conjugate of ombuin, can be isolated from F. chlorifolia.

References

External links 
Flaveria chlorifolia, Encyclopaedia of Life
photo of herbarium specimen collected in Nuevo León in 1992

chlorifolia
Flora of Northeastern Mexico
Flora of the South-Central United States
Taxa named by Asa Gray
Flora without expected TNC conservation status